M. Mohan is an Indian director of Malayalam films. Mohan has done several notable acclaimed films including Pakshe, Isabella, Oru Katha Oru Nunnakkatha, Idavela, Vida Parayum Munpe, Randu Penkuttikal and Shalini Ente Koottukari. He has scripted five films, Angene Oru Avadhikkalathu, Mukham, Sruthi, Alolam and  Vida Parayum Munpe, and wrote the story of two films, Ithile Iniyum Varu and Kathayariyathe.

Mohan's association with screenwriter John Paul has always spawned critically and commercially successful films. He has also associated with master writer Padmarajan in the films Idavela, Kochu Kochu Thettukal and Shalini Ente Koottukari. He predominantly worked during the 1980s, the golden era of Malayalam cinema.

Personal life
He is married to actress Anupama, the heroine of his movie Randu Penkuttikal. The couple have two sons Purandar Mohan & Upendhar Mohan.

Filmography
 Vadaka Veedu (1978)
 Shalini Ente Koottukari (1978) 
 Randu Pen Kuttikal (1978)
 Surya Daham (1979)
 Kochu Kochu Thettukal (1979) 
 Vida Parayum Mumbe (1981)
 Kathayariyathe (1981)
 Niram Marunna Nimishangal (1982)
 Ilakkangal (1982)
 Idavela (1982)
 Alolam (1982)
 Rachana (1983)
 Mangalam Nerunnu (1984)
 Oru Katha Oru Nunnakkatha (1986)
 Theertham (1987)
 Sruthi (1987) 
 Isabella (1988) 
 Mukham (1990) 
 Pakshe (1994) 
 Sakshyam (1995)
 Angene Oru Avadhikkalathu (1999)
 The Campus (2005)

References

External links
 
 Mohan at the Malayalam Movie Database
 Mohan's profile at Cinemaofmalayalam.net

Further reading
 

Living people
Indian male screenwriters
Malayalam film directors
Malayalam screenwriters
Malayalam film producers
20th-century Indian dramatists and playwrights
Film directors from Kerala
20th-century Indian film directors
Year of birth missing (living people)
Screenwriters from Kerala
20th-century Indian male writers